General officer commanding (GOC) is the usual title given in the armies of the United Kingdom and the Commonwealth (and some other nations, such as Ireland) to a general officer who holds a command appointment.

Thus, a general might be the GOC British II Corps (a three-star appointment) or GOC British 7th Armoured Division (a two-star appointment).

GOC-in-C
A general officer heading a particularly large or important command, such as Middle East Command or the Allied Armies in Italy, may be called a General Officer Commanding-in-Chief (GOC-in-C). The Governor of the Imperial Fortress colony of Bermuda was also appointed Commander-in-Chief of the disproportionately-large Bermuda Garrison. From 1912, when Lieutenant-General Sir George Mackworth Bullock replaced the late Lieutenant-General Sir Frederick Walter Kitchener, through the Second World War, the military office was titled General Officer Commanding-in-Chief, Bermuda. GOC-in-Cs are usually one rank higher than a GOC with GOCs of corps-level formations reporting to them.

Usage in the Indian Army
The Army Commanders who head the Training & Operational Commands of the Indian Army hold the title of GOC-in-C.
There are seven appointments currently:

 General Officer Commanding-in-Chief Central Command
 General Officer Commanding-in-Chief Eastern Command
 General Officer Commanding-in-Chief Northern Command
 General Officer Commanding-in-Chief Southern Command
 General Officer Commanding-in-Chief South Western Command
 General Officer Commanding-in-Chief Western Command
 General Officer Commanding-in-Chief Army Training Command

Equivalent term in other services
The equivalent term for naval officers is flag officer commanding (FOC) and that for air force officers is air officer commanding (AOC).
In the case of flag and air officers heading a large or important command, the term is flag officer commanding-in-chief (FOC-in-C) and air officer commanding-in-chief (AOC-in-C).

In the United States Armed Forces, the equivalent is commanding general (CG).

References

Indian military appointments
British military appointments